The 1981 Baltimore Colts season was the 29th season for the team in the National Football League (NFL). The Colts finished the NFL's 1981 season with a record of 2 wins and 14 losses, tied for fourth in the AFC East division with the New England Patriots, and also tied for the second worst record in the league. However, the Colts finished ahead of New England in the AFC East based on head-to-head sweep (2–0). Both wins over the Patriots were the first and last games of the season; Baltimore lost 14 games in between victories. They also won the two games by a combined 3 points, winning 29–28 in the first game, and 23–21 in the second meeting.

The Colts’ defense had one of the worst seasons in NFL history, setting records for points (533) and yards (6,793) allowed. (The yardage record was later surpassed by the 2012 New Orleans Saints, who allowed 7,042.) The Colts gave up more than twice as many points as they scored (259). Conversely, the Patriots, with whom they were tied in the AFC East, only gave up 48 more points than they scored. The Colts’ pass defense surrendered a staggering 8.19 yards-per-dropback, the most surrendered by any team in NFL history.

The Colts’ -274 point differential (points scored vs. points allowed) is the second-worst since the 1970 merger, second only to the 1976 expansion Tampa Bay Buccaneers, who finished 0–14 (ironically, the next year's Colts team went winless as well). The 1981 Colts are the first of only two NFL teams since 1940 to suffer eleven losses in a season during which they never had a lead. The Colts allowed 40 points in 4 separate games during the season (including 3 games in a row from weeks 6-8), which is still an NFL record.

The season included a bizarre incident in which, during the Colts’ 38–13 loss to the Philadelphia Eagles on November 15, team owner Bob Irsay called plays from the coaches’ booth. Quarterback Bert Jones told Sports Illustrated in 1986:

Offseason

NFL draft

Personnel

Staff

Roster

Regular season

Schedule

Standings

Records set 

 Most Points Allowed, Season, 533
 Worst Point Differential, 16-game season, -274
 Most First-Half Points Allowed, 16-game season, 307
 Most Touchdowns Allowed, Season, 68
 Most First Downs Allowed Season, 406
 Fewest Punt Returns, Season, 12

See also 
 History of the Indianapolis Colts
 Indianapolis Colts seasons
 Colts–Patriots rivalry

Notes

References 

Baltimore Colts
1981
Baltimore